Basina is the name of two Dark Age women involved in the sixth century politics of Merovingian Gaul:

Basina, Queen of Thuringia
Basina, daughter of Chilperic I, nun who led a revolt in Poitiers

It also refers to:
Basina, North 24 Parganas, a census town in West Bengal, India